Sternotomis runsoriensis is a species of beetle in the family Cerambycidae. It was described by Charles Joseph Gahan in 1909. It is known from Uganda and Tanzania.

References

Sternotomini
Beetles described in 1909